The Museo Pio Cristiano is one of the Vatican Museums. It houses various works of Christian antiquity.

The museum was founded by Pope Pius IX in 1854, two years after the establishment of the Pontifical Commission for Sacred Archaeology.

References

External links

The Vatican: spirit and art of Christian Rome, a book from The Metropolitan Museum of Art Libraries (fully available online as PDF), which contains material on the museum (pp. 176–189)

Art museums and galleries in Rome
Art museums established in 1854
Vatican Museums
1854 establishments in the Papal States